Shaykh Abdur Rahman, also known as Abdur Rahman Shaykh, (died 30 March 2007) was the leader and the administrative head of the banned terrorist organization Jagrata Muslim Janata Bangladesh.

Biography
Rahman was educated in Islamic fiqh and law at Saudi Arabia. After being highly critical of the Jamaat-e-Islami Bangladesh for what he deemed as its patronization of secularism and sacrilege of Islamic values and principles, he soon formed the JMJB, taking initiatives to form an all-Islamic state based upon only the Qur'an and the Sunnah. However, the group soon gained notoriety because of its radical fundamentalist activities, including murder and torture of opponents.

Militant activity
On 17 August 2005, this group claimed responsibility for more than 500 bombings across Bangladesh. The Government of Bangladesh banned the organization, and declared awards for the capture of Rahman. 
In late 2005, Rahman has been blamed for masterminding several more bomb attacks, including the first suicide bombing in Bangladesh.
Abdur Rahman and Bangla Bhai set up organisational bases and militant training camps in madrasas and in remote areas of the country, mostly in the dense forests and hilly areas. They translated their plan into action with the help of huge funds from foreign countries that were meant for building mosques and madrasas.

Capture
On 2 March 2006, Rahman was arrested  Shaplabagh in Sylhet, by Rapid Action Battalion.

Death
JMB leaders Shaykh Abdur Rahman and Siddique ul-Islam alias Bangla Bhai had been given death sentences for the killings of two assistant judges in Jhalakathi. Along with five other militants, Shaykh Abdur Rahman was executed by hanging on 30 March 2007.

Legacy
Dabiq', the official magazine of the Islamic State, has published an article titled "The Revival of Jihad in Bengal". In the article the magazine identified Shaykh Abdur Rahman as the founder of Jihad in Bangladesh and asked its followers to carry on his legacy through Jihad.

See also
17 August 2005 Bangladesh bombings

References

2007 deaths
Year of birth missing
Bangladeshi Islamists
Sunni Islamists
Executed Bangladeshi people
People executed by Bangladesh by hanging
21st-century executions by Bangladesh
Leaders of Islamic terror groups